Advertising inventory or media inventory is the space available in the media, advertising, and marketing industries to advertisers on newspapers, magazines, and digital platforms.

History
Traditionally advertising inventory was sold during upfront events in the third week of May. However, advertising space is increasingly being transacted algorithmically, such as real-time bidding.

Categories
Media space is typically broken down into four categories, which can be purchased through a variety of sales channels.

 Premium guaranteed
 Audience targeted
 Remnant
 Sponsorships

References

Advertising